The Church of Jesus Christ of Latter-day Saints in Nicaragua refers to the Church of Jesus Christ of Latter-day Saints (LDS Church) and its members in Nicaragua. The first convert was baptized in 1954 and the first Nicaraguan mission opened in 1989. As of December 31, 2021, there were 101,133 members in 109 congregations in Nicaragua.

History

The first missionaries entered the country in 1953. The first Nicaraguan convert, José de Guzman, was baptized on April 11, 1954, a year after the first missionaries arrived in the country. These missionaries, Elders Manuel Arias and Archie R. Mortensen, were serving in the Central American Mission, which Elder Spencer W. Kimball organized in 1952. In 1959, the first Nicaraguan district was formed.  The first stake (the Managua Stake) was created in March 1981 and reorganized in June 1998. Several natural disasters and political crises, including an earthquake that devastated Managua in 1972 and a civil war that began in the late 1970s, slowed missionary work throughout the 1970s and '80s. Foreign missionaries were removed from the country in 1980, and locals continued the work until full-time missionaries returned about ten years later. The first Nicaraguan members entered the temple in Guatemala City in 1987. The Nicaragua Managua Mission opened in October 1989.

In April 2018, church president Russell M. Nelson announced the first temple of the Church of Jesus Christ of Latter-day Saints to be built in Nicaragua. The Managua Nicaragua Temple was announced at the same time as six other temples.
In May 2018, a church spokesman announced that all missionaries would be removed from Nicaragua until further notice. 

A brief history can be found at LDS Newsroom (Nicaragua) or Deseret News 2010 Church Almanac (Nicaragua).

Stakes and Districts
As of February 2023, Nicaragua had the following stakes and districts:

Missions

Temples

References

External links

Church News and Events - Nicaragua
The Church of Jesus Christ of Latter-day Saints Official Site
 ComeUntoChrist.org Latter-day Saints Visitor site